Pang uk is a kind of stilt house found in Tai O, Lantau Island, Hong Kong. Pang uk are built on water or on small beaches.

A fire broke out in 2000 destroying some of the houses in Tai O, and some were later rebuilt.

They were once found in many other fishing towns and villages in rural Hong Kong, but only those in Tai O are preserved in a large scale, with some in the Lei Yue Mun Village and Ma San Tsuen in Lei Yue Mun. Pang uk developed from the boat houses of Tanka or fishing people, after they moved to reside on land.

See also
 Housing in Hong Kong

External links

A letter by residents of pang uk to a newspaper
TVB iFiles - a programme on a Hong Kong TV channel

Pictures
Photo gallery of Tai O and the pang uk
from Heritage Museum website
from HK-place.com
from HK-place.com
Pang uk along a river
A newspaper cutting
Picture of a pang uk at Sam Ka Tsuen, near Lei Yue Mun

Architecture in Hong Kong
Tai O
Stilt houses
Coastal construction
Cantonese words and phrases
Culture of Hong Kong
Tourist attractions in Hong Kong
Buildings and structures in Hong Kong
Housing in Hong Kong